Edvardas is a Lithuanian masculine given name, a cognate of Edward.

Edvardas Gudavičius (born  1929), historian in modern Lithuania
Edvardas Jokūbas Daukša (1836–1890), Lithuanian poet, translator, participant of 1863 Uprising 

Masculine given names
Lithuanian masculine given names